Tamanoya is a kami from Japanese mythology. He is believed to be the creator of Yasakani no Magatama.

Tama-no-iwaya is believed to be the grave for the kami, and he is venerated at Tamanooya-jinja but is not venerated at any kampeisha.

Family 

The Nihon Shoki states that he was the son of Ninigi, while the Shinsen Shōjiroku says he was the grandson of Takamimusubi. He is also viewed as the ancestral kami of the Shinabe clan.

Names 
A list names he goes by:

 Amenoakarutama
 Ama no akarutama
 Toyotama
 Tama no oya 
 Kushiakarutama no kami
 Haakaru tama
 Tamanoya no mikoto

References 

Japanese gods
Japanese mythology
Amatsukami